Muḥammad Muneeb-ur-Rehman ( Munīb-ur-Rehmān; born ) is a Pakistani Mufti and former chairman of Ruet-e-Hilal Committee. He is a professor at Jinnah University for Women, Member of National Academic Council of Institute of Policy Studies, Head of Shariah Board of Burj Bank and President of Tanzeem-ul-Madaris and Darul Uloom Naeemia, Karachi.

Life and education 
Muneeb-ur-Rehman was born on 8 February 1945 in a Gujjar family of Mansehra, NWFP, British Raj. He completed his Masters in Islamic Studies. Besides gaining a Bachelor in Law and Education degree, he also received education in Arabic Languages. He completed a master's degree from Darul Uloom Amjadia.

Muneeb-ur-Rehman is a member of the Board of Studies of Federal Urdu University and Board of Intermediate Education, Karachi. He was a member of the Pakistani delegation which visited the UK in February - March 2006 to gain firsthand knowledge as to how Madrassas and Islamic schools operate within a state-regulated system in the UK. He has also attended a number of international conferences in the USA, UK, Norway, Hong Kong, Saudi Arabia, South Africa and so many other countries.

Call to sack Information Minister of Pakistan
Munib-ur-Rehman called for the removal of Pakistani Information Minister Pervaiz Rashid and demanded that Prime Minister Nawaz Sharif take immediate action against him.

Moon sightings
In December 1999, Mohammed Yousuf Qureshi, a member of the committee from Khyber Pakhtunkhwa, accused Muneeb-ur-Rehman and others of distrusting testimonies from his home province to make a hasty announcement that the new moon had not been sighted anywhere in the country. Peshawar has always remained a controversial place when it comes to moon sightings.

Ruet e Hilal Committee
In 1998, Government of Pakistan appointed him chairman of Ruet-e-Hilal Committee. He served for approximately 22 years as chairman and removed from his office on 30 December 2020. He is also considered as the Grand Mufti Of Pakistan by Barelvi Sunnis.

Books
 Khulasa E Tafseer
Arbaeen e Tijarat Wa Maeshat
Tafheem-ul-Masail (12 Vol)
 Qanoon-e-Shariat
Tafseer Surah-Tu-Nisa
 Usool-e-Fiqah Islam
Sultan Shamasuddin Altamsh: History and Story
Zakat Ke Masail

References

External links
 Subject page on Internet Archive
Details of Mufti Muneeb-ur-Rehman

1945 births
Grand Muftis of Pakistan
Academic staff of Jinnah University for Women
Pakistani Sunni Muslim scholars of Islam
People from Mansehra District
Living people